Geissman is a surname. Notable people with the surname include:

 Gladys Geissman (aka Merry Hull, 1908–1978), American accessory designer
 Grant Geissman (born 1953), American jazz guitarist and composer